Ceratozamia euryphyllidia is a species of plant in the family Zamiaceae. It is found in Guatemala and in the Mexican state of Oaxaca and Veracruz (in the isthmus of Tehuantepec region). It is threatened by habitat loss.

References

euryphyllidia
Flora of Guatemala
Flora of Oaxaca
Flora of Veracruz
Critically endangered plants
Endangered biota of Mexico
Taxonomy articles created by Polbot